Dôn is an ancestor figure in Welsh legend and literature. She is typically given as the mother of a group known as the "Children of Dôn", including Gwydion, Arianrhod, and Gilfaethwy, among many others. However, antiquarians of the early modern era generally considered Dôn a male figure.

The House of Dôn

In astronomy

Llys Dôn (literally "The Court of Dôn") is the traditional Welsh name for the constellation Cassiopeia. At least three of Dôn's children also have astronomical associations: Caer Gwydion ("The Castle of Gwydion") is the traditional Welsh name for the Milky Way, and Caer Arianrhod ("The Castle of Arianrhod") being the constellation of Corona Borealis.

See also
The House of Llŷr
Tuatha Dé Danann
Danu (Irish goddess)

References

External links
The New Companion to the Literature of Wales, Meic Stephens.

Welsh goddesses
Mother goddesses